David Álvarez may refer to:
 David Álvarez (bishop) (born 1941), Episcopal bishop in Puerto Rico
 David Álvarez (artist) (born 1972), creator of the comic strip Yenny
 David Alvarez (politician) (born 1980), San Diego City Council member
 Kily Álvarez (David Álvarez, born 1984), Equatoguinean football midfielder
 David Álvarez (footballer, born 1985), Honduran football defender
 David Álvarez (footballer, born 1992), Colombian football centre-back
 David Álvarez (footballer, born 1994), Spanish football forward
 David Alvarez (actor) (born 1994), Canadian dancer and actor